The Rural Municipality of Martin No. 122 is a rural municipality (RM) in the Canadian province of Saskatchewan within Census Division No. 5 and  Division No. 1.

History 
The RM of Martin No. 122 incorporated as a rural municipality on January 1, 1913.

Demographics 

Geography

Communities and localities 
The following urban municipalities are surrounded by the RM.

Towns
 Wapella

The RM also surrounds the Ochapowace 71-26 First Nations Indian reserve.

Government 
The RM of Martin No. 122 is governed by an elected municipal council and an appointed administrator that meets on the second Wednesday of every month. The reeve of the RM is Gerald Flaman while its administrator is Cheryl Barrett. The RM's office is located in Moosomin.

References

External links 

M

Division No. 5, Saskatchewan